Florian Müller (born 14 September 1987) is a German politician for the CDU and since 2021 member of the Bundestag, the federal diet.

Life and politics 

Müller was born 1987 in the West German town of Attendorn was elected directly to the Bundestag in 2021.

References 

Living people
1987 births
Christian Democratic Union of Germany politicians
Members of the Bundestag 2021–2025
21st-century German politicians
21st-century German women politicians